Matty Costello (born ) is a professional rugby league footballer who plays as a  for Salford Red Devils in the Betfred Super League.

He has previously played for St Helens in the Super League, and has spent time on loan from Saints at the Sheffield Eagles and the Leigh Centurions in the Betfred Championship.

Background
Costello was born in Billinge Higher End, Greater Manchester.

Career

St Helens
In 2018, he made his Super League début for St Helens against the Huddersfield Giants.
Costello graduated into the first team squad by the 2018 season. Costello played at the Orrell St James ARLFC from an early age before starting a scholarship with the Saints in 2014. Costello was equally at home at centre or in the full back role. This quick, elusive player was a strong defender and played his first senior matches for the Sheffield Eagles club.
In 2018 he spent time on loan at the Sheffield Eagles, where he went on to pick up the 2018 Championship Young Player of the Year award after an impressive season with the Sheffield club. In seasons 2019 and 2020, Costello was a squad player for St Helens as the club went on to win back to back Super League Grand finals.

Salford Red Devils
On 9 December 2020, it was announced that Costello would join Salford for the 2021 season on a three-year deal

References

External links
St Helens profile
Saints Heritage Society profile
SL profile

1998 births
Living people
Barrow Raiders players
English rugby league players
Leigh Leopards players
Newcastle Thunder players
Rugby league centres
Rugby league players from Wigan
Salford Red Devils players
Sheffield Eagles players
St Helens R.F.C. players